The Philippine Schools Debate Championship (PSDC) is an annual English-language debate tournament for high school-level teams from the Philippines. It is hosted by Ateneo de Manila University's Ateneo Debate Society (ADS) and its debates are conducted in the British Parliamentary Style. From its inception in 2002, it has become one of the two most prestigious Philippine national competitions for high school debaters, the other being the National Asians High School Debate Championship (NAsHDC) hosted by De La Salle University-Manila's La Salle Debate Society.

The Philippine Daily Inquirer became the primary sponsor of the tournament in 2003, at which point it was called the Inquirer-2bU! Interscholastic Debating Championship (IISDC). Recently the Inquirer ended its long-standing agreement with the ADS and the name reverted to PSDC in 2007. It is also regularly sponsored by the Konrad Adenauer Foundation.

Tournament format
PSDC Debates are held in the British Parliamentary Style. The tournament uses the Swiss system for deciding matchups between competing teams in the preliminary rounds. The 32 highest scoring teams then advance (or "break") to the finals series, where the first and second placed teams in each round advance to the next highest levels of competition. A team cap (or limit on the number of breaking teams from one institution) of FIVE teams is imposed.

In 2004 a regional championship for the PSDC was introduced, to give teams from outside Metro Manila more representation at the higher levels of competition. As these teams began to show in the regular break, this championship was discontinued.

An extemporaneous public speaking competition is also held alongside the debate rounds. This competition has its own preliminary, semifinal, and final rounds.

In 2008, a secondary tournament for the PSDC was introduced. Teams eligible for this final were those from institutions that never had a team in the final round of the PSDC. The round is a battle of the top four eligible teams. The final has been christened the Ana Alano Cup, in memory of the Ateneo Debater who had died defending her father in a hit against him for attempting to expose a hospital corruption scandal.

Speakers from teams who have broken in the tournament are considered eligible to try out for a slot in the Philippine team to the World Schools Debating Championships.

There was no PSDC 2015 due to the academic calendar shift that occurred within the Ateneo De Manila University.

Past champions

Past best speakers in debate and public speaking

Schools debating competitions